Irina Yuryevna Dolgova (born September 26, 1995) is a Russian judoka. She competed at the 2016 Summer Olympics in the women's 48 kg event, in which she was eliminated in the second round by Paula Pareto. She also competed in the women's 48 kg event at the 2020 Summer Olympics held in Tokyo, Japan.

References

External links
 
 
 

1995 births
Living people
Russian female judoka
Olympic judoka of Russia
Judoka at the 2016 Summer Olympics
Judoka at the 2020 Summer Olympics
Judoka at the 2015 European Games
Judoka at the 2019 European Games
European Games medalists in judo
European Games bronze medalists for Russia
European Games silver medalists for Russia
People from Bratsk
Sportspeople from Irkutsk Oblast
21st-century Russian women